Solveig Adina Olena Rönn-Christiansson (11 November 1902 – 8 June 1982) was a Swedish politician and trade unionist. She served as a member of the Second Chamber of the Parliament of Sweden for the Communist Party for two separate terms: the first term 1937-1940 and the second term 1945–1958. Between her two terms in Parliament, she served as a member of the Gothenburg City Council in 1943-1946.

Life
Solveig Rönn-Christiansson was born in Gothenburg as one of ten children to the lamp-post-janitor Olof Natanael Ståhle Rönn and Alma Charlotta Johansdotter. In 1934 she married the metal worker Bertil Joar Christiansson, whom she divorced in 1948. They had a daughter.

Unionist
Rönn-Christiansson started to work as a teenager, and worked as a maid, in a confectionery and as a washerwoman in the Sahlgrenska University Hospital. 
She was politically engaged early on. She joined the Swedish Municipal Workers' Union in 1925, sat in the board of the local union in 1926-1928 and served as its secretary in 1935. In 1931, she was arrested in connection to the Ådalen shootings. She was prosecuted but was in the end released. She herself commented on the fact that she escaped a prison sentence: "In a way, I did felt it was a shame, because it thought that if I was placed in prison, I would have been given the opportunity to educate myself somewhat".

Policial career

In parallel to her union work, she became engaged in the Communist Party. She served as member of the Communist Gothenburg section in 1930-1932 and as a representative of the Communists in the Gothenburg school board in 1936. In the 1936 election, she was nominated to the Parliament Second Chamber by the Gothenburg Communists and won. In the election of 1940, she lost her seat because the Communist Party in Sweden lost their favor with the Swedish voters because of the Soviet Union's attack of Finland. Instead, she took a seat in the Gothenburg City Council. When the sympathy for the Communists became higher in Sweden after the Russian's victory over Nazi Germany, she was able to win her Parliament seat again in 1945. 

Solveig Rönn-Christiansson was the first woman Communist to be elected to the Swedish Parliament. She was very active during her time there. In Parliament, she focused on social politics and union issues, such as legislation of the right to sedation during delivery and equal pay for equal work between men and women. She also motioned for the ban of spanking in the educational system, which she condemned both for being pedagogically counterproductive as well as socially discriminatory, as she claimed the spanking was mainly used toward working class students. She was before her time when she stated that the issue of economy in the home was not an issue for women and housewives but for the nation as a whole. This was issues in which she had experience from her work as a unionist and as a school board member. In 1945, she was elected to serve in the school text book commission, in which she served until 1953. 

Solveig Rönn-Christiansson was a popular member of the labor movement in Gothenburg, where was often able to mediate between the Communists and the Social Democrats.

Later life
After leaving her seat in Parliament in 1958, Solveig Rönn-Christiansson worked as a janitor at the Sahlgrenska University Hospital. 

She was also active as a lay judge.

Sources 
 Tvåkammarriksdagen 1867-1970 (Almqvist & Wiksell International 1992), band 4, s. 144
 Hemarbete som politik, Britta Lövgren, Almqvist & Wiksell, 1993
 Wiberg, Roger: Den stora agadebatten (2006)
 

1902 births
1982 deaths
Members of the Riksdag
Swedish communists
Women members of the Riksdag
20th-century Swedish women politicians
20th-century Swedish politicians
Swedish domestic workers
Swedish trade unionists